"Western Movies" is a song written by Cliff Goldsmith and Fred Sledge Smith and performed by The Olympics.  It reached #7 on the U.S. R&B chart, #8 on the U.S. pop chart, and #12 on the UK Singles Chart in 1958.

Other versions
Johnny Worth released a version of the song as a single in 1958, but it did not chart.
Michael Martin Murphey released a version of the song coupled with "Another Cheap Western" on his 1979 album Peaks, Valleys, Honky Tonks & Alleys.
Jive Bunny and the Mastermixers released a version of the song on their 2000 album The Songs of Rodgers & Hammerstein.
Ray Stevens released a version of the song on his 2012 album Encyclopedia of Recorded Comedy Music.

References

1958 songs
1958 singles
The Olympics (band) songs
Michael Martin Murphey songs
Jive Bunny and the Mastermixers songs
Ray Stevens songs
Songs written by Fred Sledge Smith